The Newton–Pepys problem is a probability problem concerning the probability of throwing sixes from a certain number of dice.

In 1693 Samuel Pepys and Isaac Newton corresponded over a problem posed to Pepys by a school teacher named John Smith. The problem was:

Pepys initially thought that outcome C had the highest probability, but Newton correctly concluded that outcome A actually has the highest probability.

Solution
The probabilities of outcomes A, B and C are:

These results may be obtained by applying the binomial distribution (although Newton obtained them from first principles). In general, if P(n) is the probability of throwing at least n sixes with 6n dice, then:

As n grows, P(n) decreases monotonically towards an asymptotic limit of 1/2.

Example in R 
The solution outlined above can be implemented in R as follows:
for (s in 1:3) {          # looking for s = 1, 2 or 3 sixes
  n = 6*s                 # ... in n = 6, 12 or 18 dice
  q = pbinom(s-1, n, 1/6) # q = Prob( <s sixes in n dice )
  cat("Probability of at least", s, "six in", n, "fair dice:", 1-q, "\n")
}

Newton's explanation
Although Newton correctly calculated the odds of each bet, he provided a separate intuitive explanation to Pepys. He imagined that B and C toss their dice in groups of six, and said that A was most favorable because it required a 6 in only one toss, while B and C required a 6 in each of their tosses. This explanation assumes that a group does not produce more than one 6, so it does not actually correspond to the original problem.

Generalizations
A natural generalization of the problem is to consider n non-necessarily fair dice, with p the probability that each die will select the 6 face when thrown (notice that actually the number of faces of the dice and which face should be selected are irrelevant). If r is the total number of dice selecting the 6 face, then  is the probability of having at least k correct selections when throwing exactly n dice. Then the original Newton–Pepys problem can be generalized as follows:

Let  be natural positive numbers s.t. .

Notice that, with this notation, the original Newton–Pepys problem reads as: is ?

As noticed in Rubin and Evans (1961), there are no uniform answers to the generalized Newton–Pepys problem since answers depend on k, n and p. There are nonetheless some variations of the previous questions that admit uniform answers:

(from Chaundy and Bullard (1960)):

(from Varagnolo, Pillonetto and Schenato (2013)):

If  are positive natural numbers, and  then .

References

Factorial and binomial topics
Probability problems
Isaac Newton
Mathematical problems